Alphonse Soppo (born 15 May 1985, in Yaoundé, Cameroon) is a Cameroonian football midfielder.

Club statistics
Total matches played in Moldavian First League: 144 matches - 2 goals

References

External links

Profile at FC Dacia Chișinău

1985 births
Footballers from Yaoundé
Cameroonian footballers
Cameroonian expatriate footballers
Living people
FC Dacia Chișinău players
FC Nistru Otaci players
FC Costuleni players
FC Dinamo-Auto Tiraspol players
FK Rudar Pljevlja players
FK Zeta players
Moldovan Super Liga players
Montenegrin First League players
Expatriate footballers in Moldova
Cameroonian expatriate sportspeople in Moldova
Expatriate footballers in Montenegro
Cameroonian expatriate sportspeople in Montenegro
Association football midfielders